Giovanni Benini (1569–1636) was a Roman Catholic prelate who served as Titular Archbishop of Hadrianopolis in Haemimonto (1622–1636).

Biography
Giovanni Benini was born in Rome, Italy on 26 June 1569.
On 18 October 1622, he was appointed during the papacy of Pope Gregory XV as Titular Archbishop of Hadrianopolis in Haemimonto.
On 31 December 1622, he was consecrated bishop by Ulpiano Volpi, Bishop of Novara, with Joannes Mattaeus Caryophyllis, Titular Archbishop of Iconium, and Girolamo Tantucci, Bishop of Grosseto, serving as co-consecrators. 
He served as Titular Archbishop of Hadrianopolis in Haemimonto until his death on 2 November 1636.

While bishop, he was the principal co-consecrator of Federico Baldissera Bartolomeo Cornaro, Bishop of Bergamo (1623).

References

External links and additional sources
 (for Chronology of Bishops)
 (for Chronology of Bishops)

17th-century Roman Catholic titular bishops
Bishops appointed by Pope Gregory XV
Clergy from Rome
1569 births
1636 deaths